= Julia B. Olayanju =

Nigerian-American geneticist

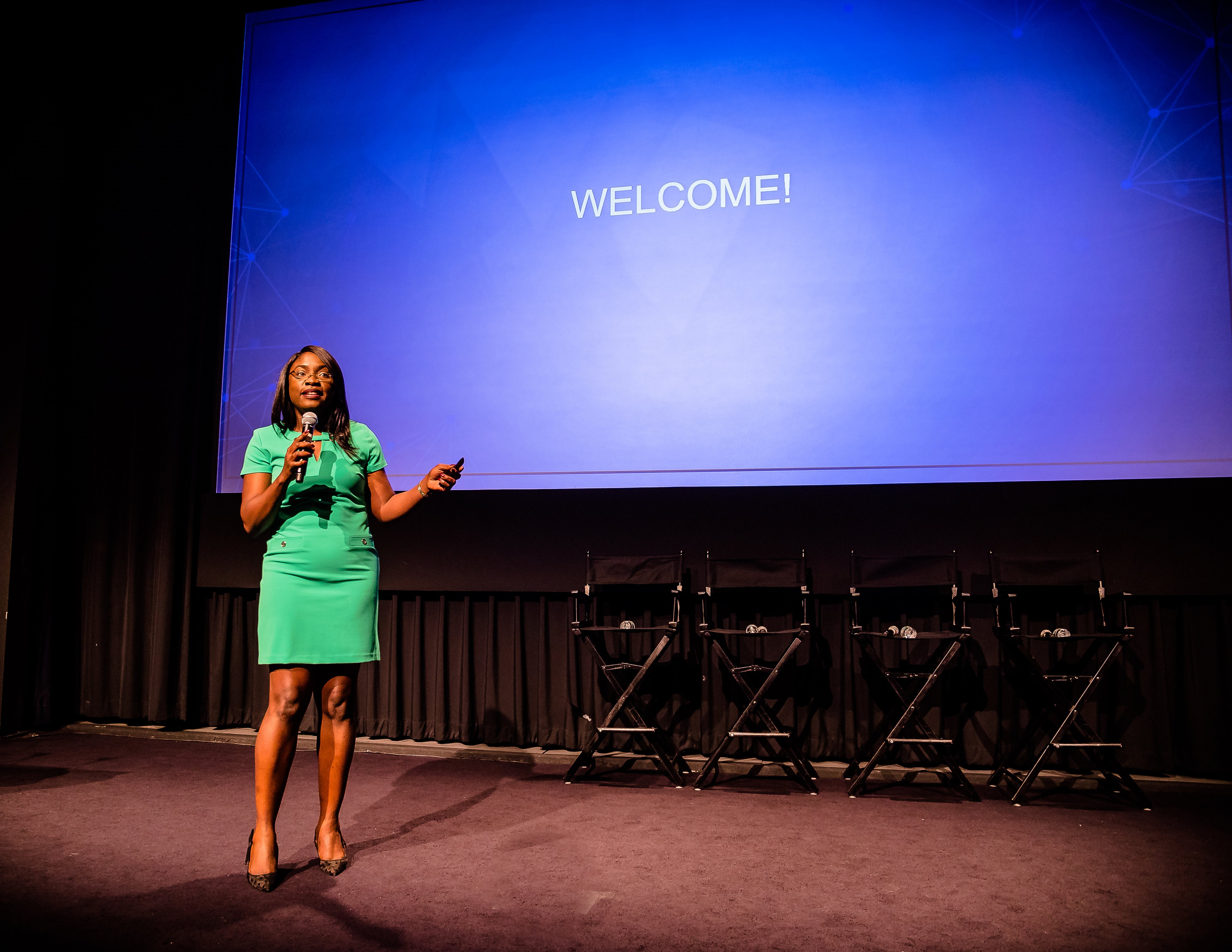
- Education: Rutgers University (BA) West Texas A & M University (MS) Rutgers Robert Wood Johnson Medical School, New Jersey (PhD) Harvard TH Chan School Of Public Health (MPH)
- Spouse: Bunmi Olayanju (m. 2006)
- Children: 2
- Website: https://www.juliaolayanju.com/

Julia B Olayanju is a geneticist, educator, and a pioneer in leveraging technology and scientific concepts to promote nutrition education for students in grades K-12. She adopts different approaches to increase public awareness on the science of food and health. She is the founder at FoodNiche Inc. and GrubEasy Interactive Labs Inc.

== Education ==
Olayanju developed an interest in scientific research while working on a research project for her master's degree at West Texas A & M University. She later proceeded to Rutgers University, New Brunswick, New Jersey where she earned her Ph.D. in Microbiology and Molecular Genetics. Her doctoral research work focused on understanding the anti-cancer properties and mechanism of action of isothiocyanates in breast cancer cells. She earned a Masters in Public Health from Harvard TH Chan School of Public Health

== Work ==
Olayanju is the convener of the FoodNiche Tech Summit & The FoodNiche Global Innovation Summit creating networking and learning opportunities for food industry stakeholders. The conferences bring together experts from academia with business leaders from the food industry for collaboration and thought-provoking conversations on shaping a healthier food system.

Olayanju co-founded GrubEasy Interactive Labs Inc. to leverage technology to promote science of food and health education. Through the technology platform FoodNiche®-Ed, teachers can engage, reward and educate students on the science of food and health.

Olayanju leverages the media to communicate scientific facts and promote awareness on the importance of food to overall well-being. She started this through her column on Forbes and more recently by hosting scientists and food industry experts from around the world on The FoodNiche Changemaker Podcast

== Personal life ==
Julia B. Olayanju married Bunmi Olayanju in 2006. They have 2 children: Joshua (born April 2007) and David (born February 2010).
